Jubilo, Jr. is a 1924 short silent comedy film directed by Robert F. McGowan. It was the 27th Our Gang short subject released.

Synopsis
A hobo, played by Will Rogers tells of his adventure as a child when he tried to raise the money to buy his mother a hat for her birthday.

Notes
 Jubilo, Jr. would be remade in 1932 as Birthday Blues.
The title references Rogers' 1919 film Jubilo.
Though never included in the original television package of Our Gang silents, this film did appear in the TV series Silents Please.
The grocer is played by Mickey Daniels’ father Richard Daniels.
About thirty seconds of unused footage was used in the later Our Gang film Boys Will Be Joys.

Cast

The Gang
 Mickey Daniels as Young Jubilo
 Joe Cobb as Joe
 Jackie Condon as Jackie
 Allen Hoskins as Farina
 Mary Kornman as Mary
 Andy Samuel - Andy / Charlie Chaplin
 Dick Henchen as Dick
 Pal the Dog as Pal

Additional cast
 Will Rogers as Jubilo / Himself
 Lassie Lou Ahern as Circus Performer
 Allan Cavan as Hat vendor
 Charley Chase as Director
 Richard Daniels as Grocer
 Otto Himm as Photographer
 Lyle Tayo as Mother
 Leo Willis as Tramp pal of Jubilo
 Noah Young as Emil, Jubilo's father
 Joy Winthrop as Extra outside church
 Jerry McGowan
 Roberta McGowan

See also
 Our Gang filmography

References

External links

1924 films
1924 comedy films
American black-and-white films
Films directed by Robert F. McGowan
Hal Roach Studios short films
American silent short films
Our Gang films
1924 short films
1920s American films
Silent American comedy films